Mounaraagam is an Indian Telugu language television drama series that aired on Star Maa from 16 September 2018 to 30 January 2021. It stars Priyanka Jain, Shiva Kumar Marihal and Anil Allam in lead roles. It is also available on digital streaming platform Disney+ Hotstar.

Synopsis 
The story is about a dumb child girl Ammulu who is rejected by her father Seenaiah. Ankith loves Ammulu for her good heart and kind nature. Ankith's mother Nandini hates disabled child and reject his marriage proposal. After some series of consequences Ammulu and Ankith got married. Vishnu plans to kill Ammulu but unfortunately Ankith dies in boat accident. Everyone believes Ankith died but ammulu didn't accept it. Meanwhile, seenaiah realises his mistakes, accepts ammulu as his daughter. And plans her marriage with Anurag. Finally Ankith returns and stays with Ammulu.

Cast

Main 

 Priyanka Jain as Ammulu; Seenaiah and Neelaveni's elder daughter; Ankith's wife; 
 Baby Sahruda as Young Ammulu
 Shivakumar Marihal as Ankith; Nandini's son; Ammulu's husband
 Anil Allam as Seenaiah(2020-2021); Neelaveni's husband; Ammulu,Vasantha and Chakri's father
 Sakshi Shiva(2018-2020) as Seenaiah

Recurring 

 Sirisha as Neelaveni; Seenaiah's wife; Ammulu,Vasantha and Chakri's mother
 Sai Lalitha (Later)  as Nandini; Ankith's mother
 Swathi(Earlier) as Nandini 
 Shravani as Vasantha; Ammulu's sister
 Neema Singh as Lucky; Ankith's sister; Chakri's wife
 Draksharamam Saroja as Kanthamma; Seenaiah's sister; Ammulu,Vasantha and Chakri's aunt
 Malineni Hemanth as Chakri; Ammulu's brother; Ankith's brother-in-law; Lucky's husband; Nandini's son-in-law
 Rajeev Ravichandra as Bharath; Loves ammulu with bad intentions
 Antara as Pooja; Ankith's child hood friend and loves 
 Kona Vasantha as Sarayu; Ankith's love interest
 Haritha as Sarayu
 Chakri as Pooja's Father
 Pavan Ravindra as Anurag; Blind person; Loves ammulu;
 Jaya Lalita as Village head / Dharmakartha
 Jyothi Reddy as Doctor Sunitha
 Roopa Reddy as Kalpavalli; Vishnu's wife; Sarayu's mother;
 Janardhan as Vishnu; Sarayu's father
 Naresh Lolla as Dhanush; Chakri's friend
 Srinivas as Joseph; Seenaiah's friend; Ammulu's well wisher;
 Sandhya Rani as Joseph's wife
 Rithu Chowdary as Gayathri

Cameo Appearance 

 Sujitha as Sita

Adaptations

Reception 
The series had a third placing in the TRP charts for a week in 2020.

Title Song

References

External links 

 Mounaraagam on Disney+ Hotstar

Indian television soap operas
Serial drama television series
Telugu-language television shows
Indian drama television series
Star Maa original programming
2018 Indian television series debuts
2021 Indian television series endings
Television remakes